István Andrássy may refer to:
 István Andrássy (author), Hungarian author and nobleman
 István Andrássy (general) (1650–1720), Hungarian Kuruc general and nobleman
 István Andrássy (scientist) (1927–2012), Hungarian nematologist